Everybody Come On Out is an album by jazz saxophonist Stanley Turrentine recorded for the Fantasy label in 1976 and featuring performances by Turrentine with an orchestra arranged and conducted by Wade Marcus. The album consists of Turrentine's versions of many current pop hits.

Reception
The Allmusic review by Rovi Staff simply stated "A very large group session recorded in March 1976 for Fantasy".

Track listing
 "Everybody Come on Out" (Wade Marcus) - 4:18
 "Stairway to Heaven" (Kenny Gamble, Leon Huff) - 3:56
 "There Is a Place (Rita's Theme)" (Pamela Turrentine) - 6:14
 "Many Rivers to Cross" (Jimmy Cliff) - 4:18
 "Hope That We Can Be Together Soon" (Gamble, Huff) - 5:51
 "All by Myself" (Eric Carmen) - 3:40
 "Airport Love Theme" (Vincent Bell) - 5:36
 "I'm Not in Love" (Eric Stewart, Graham Gouldman) - 4:03

Personnel
Stanley Turrentine - tenor saxophone
Chuck Findley - trumpet, slide trumpet, flugelhorn
Oscar Brashear, Bob Findley, Paul Hubinon - trumpet, flugelhorn
George Bohanon, Charlie Loper - trombone
Lew McCreary - bass trombone
Bill Green - flute, English horn, baritone saxophone
Buddy Collette - tenor saxophone, flute
Dorothy Ashby - harp
Joe Sample - electric piano
Dawilli Gonga - synthesizer
Craig McMullen, Lee Ritenour - guitar
Paul Jackson - electric bass
Harvey Mason - drums
Bill Summers - congas, bongos, percussion 
Glenn Dicterow, Bobby DuBow, Winterton Garvey, Janice Gower, Michelle Grab, Carl LaMagna, Bob Lipsett, Mitchell Markowitz, Charles Veal, Kenneth Yerke - violin
Denyse Buffum, David Campbell, Pamela Goldsmith, Arthur Royval - viola
Ronald Cooper, Dennis Karmazyn, David Speltz - cello
Richard Feves - contrabass
Wade Marcus - arranger, conductor

References

1976 albums
Stanley Turrentine albums
Fantasy Records albums
Albums arranged by Wade Marcus
Albums produced by Orrin Keepnews